The men's singles event at the 2022 South American Games was held from 11 to 15 october.

Draw

Final four

Top half

Bottom half

References

External links
Individual Male 

Men's Singles